Per Hanefjord born Per Håkan Tobias Hanefjord September 25, 1978 in Lycksele, Swedish film director and screenwriter.
Per Hanefjord has written and directed a number of internationally acclaimed short films and was educated at Dramatiska Institutet (Dramatic Institute), directing course 2005-2008.
Hanefjords diploma film from DI "Elkland" was awarded (2009) with a "Student Oscar" of The Academy of Motion Picture Arts and Sciences.

Filmography 

Director:

RIG45 (2018)

Tyskungen - Camilla Läckberg (2013)
aka: The Hidden Child

Elkland (2009)

Mellan oss (2008)
aka: "Between You And Me"

Anita Of Sweden (2008)

Mellan 11 och 12 (2008) (TV) (segment "Kyrkan")

Forechecking morfar (2007)
aka: Fore-Checking Grandpa

Allt Man vill (2006)
aka: "All That You Want"

En god dag (2005)
aka: "A Good Day"

Barn leker ute (2002)
aka: "Kids Play outside"

Svärmor (2001)
aka: "Mother in Law"

Screenwriter:

Elkland (2009)

Forechecking morfar (2007)
aka: Fore-Checking Grandpa

En god dag (2005)
aka: "A Good Day"

Barn leker ute (2002)
aka: "Kids Play Outside"

Svärmor (2001)
aka: "Mother in Law"

Cinematography:

Gropen (2000)
aka: "The Pit"

External links
 

Swedish screenwriters
Swedish male screenwriters
1978 births
Living people
Student Academy Award winners
Swedish film directors